Lewis R. Lancaster (born 27 October 1932) is Emeritus Professor of the Department of East Asian Languages at the University of California, Berkeley, USA, and has served as President, Adjunct Professor, and Chair of the dissertation committee at University of the West since 1992.  He graduated from Roanoke College (B.A.) in 1954 and received an Honorary Doctorate of Letters from Roanoke in 2007.  He is also a 1958 graduate of USC-ST (M.Th.) and a 1968 graduate of the University of Wisconsin (Ph.D.).  He received an Honorary Doctorate of Buddhist Studies from Vietnam Buddhist University in 2011.

Lewis Lancaster has published over 55 articles and reviews and has edited or authored numerous books including Prajnaparamita and Related Systems, The Korean Buddhist Canon, Buddhist Scriptures, Early Ch’an in China and Tibet, and Assimilation of Buddhism in Korea.  He also founded the Electronic Cultural Atlas Initiative to use the computer-based technology to map the spread of Buddhism from the remote past to the present.

In the fall of 1977, Lancaster accompanied artist and monk Jung-kwang as they traveled through Korea, and published a book based on their trip.

In 2008 Lancaster gave the Burke Lectureship on Religion & Society.  Professor Lancaster is the research advisor for the Buddha's Birthday Education Project.  He was the Chair of Buddhist Studies at UC, Berkeley, USA and Editor of the Berkeley Buddhist Studies Series.

Lancaster is the research adviser for the Buddha's Birthday Education Project, which has documented and hosted art exhibitions of the celebration of the Buddha's birthday in Chinese Buddhism throughout history.

Lancaster was a key figure in the creation of descriptive catalogue and digitization of the Korean Buddhist Canon. He was awarded the 2014 Grand Award from the Korean Buddhist Order for his contribution to Buddhism.

External Links
 Faculty page at University of California, Berkeley
 Lewis Lancaster page at Buddha's Birthday Education Project
 Faculty Page at Centre of Buddhist Studies, The University of Hong Kong
 The Korean Buddhist Canon: A Descriptive Catalogue: . Retrieved 9 March 2020.
 
Reference List

1932 births
Living people
University of California, Berkeley College of Letters and Science faculty
American Buddhists
People from Berkeley, California
Place of birth missing (living people)